Sahaquiel is listed as one of the seven great archangels in the Third Book of Enoch from the Apocrypha of the Hebrew Bible, described as "the guardian of the fourth heaven ... prince of a heavenly host ... attended by 496,000 myriads of minstering angels.".  Sahaquiel literally means Ingenuity of God.

See also
 List of angels in theology

References

External links
 — 'Sahaquiel: The Angel of the Sky' by Elizabeth Fitzgerald

Individual angels
Archangels